The International Journal of Audiology is a monthly peer-reviewed medical journal covering research in audiology, including psychoacoustics, anatomy, physiology, cellular and molecular biology, genetics, neuroscience, speech and hearing sciences and rehabilitation devices. It is an official journal of the British Society of Audiology, the International Society of Audiology, and the Nordic Audiological Society.

The journal was established in 1962 as Audiology, obtaining its current title after a merger with the British Journal of Audiology, and Scandinavian Audiology that took place in 2002. It is published by Taylor & Francis and the editor-in-chief is De Wet Swanepoel (University of Pretoria).

According to the Journal Citation Reports, the journal has a 2021 impact factor of 2.437.

References

External links 

International Society of Audiology
Nordic Audiological Society
British Society of Audiology

English-language journals
Audiology journals
Taylor & Francis academic journals
Publications established in 1962
Monthly journals